Events from the 1460s in Denmark.

Incumbents
 Monarch — King Christian I

 Steward of the Realm – Erik Ottesen Rosenkrantz

Events

1460
 5 March – The Treaty of Ribe returns Duchy of Schleswig to Denmark and makes Christian I Count of Golstein.

(C.) 1465
 The Oldenburg Horn is created.

Births
  – Aage Jepsen Sparre, archbishop (d. 1540)
  – Mette Dyre, noble, nominal sheriff and chancellor (d. c. 1533)

Deaths

References

1460s in Denmark